The SNK European Democrats is a political party in the Czech Republic, led by Zdeňka Marková. The first regular chairperson of this party was Jana Hybášková. The party was created in January 2006 by the merger of two Czech political parties – SNK Union of Independents, led by the former Foreign Minister Josef Zieleniec, and the European Democrats, led by Jan Kasl, the former Mayor of the City of Prague.

European Democrats 

The European Democrats were founded by Kasl, who resigned from his post as Mayor of Prague in protest at the policies of the Civic Democratic Party (ODS), Prague's municipal government. In the 2002 municipal elections in Prague, the ED won 15 seats, finishing in second place and becoming the main opposition party. In the 2004 Senate elections, they won one seat out of 27. Kasl remained the party's chairman until the party merged with SNK.

SNK Union of Independents

Cooperation and merger 

Although the two parties did not merge until 2006, they had already formed an alliance prior to the 2004 European Parliament elections, winning 11% of the vote with three MEPs elected: Josef Zieleniec, Jana Hybášková, and Tomáš Zatloukal.

Merger negotiations began immediately after the positive results in the 2004 elections, and the result was that the two parties united into one, named the SNK European Democrats. The extended delay to the merger was because according to Czech law, "if two parties unite to form a new party then they would lose their right on the money for their mandates" (950 000 CZK per senator per year and around 12 000 000 CZK for all their seats in Prague's municipal government), and these funds were crucial for the forthcoming parliament elections. No formal chairman was appointed; instead, the merged party was led by Josef Zieleniec as the "Political Leader" and Jan Kasl as the "Executive Vice Chairman."

The new party hoped to win support from voters who were tired of mainstream political parties. However, there were tensions between former SNK and ED members and a dispute over funding, when Social Democrat Finance Minister Bohuslav Sobotka refused to pay out the money for ED's seats in Prague's municipal government (around 15 000 000 CZK), despite declarations from the Czech Ombudsman, and the Supreme Administrative and Constitutional Court that ED had the right to these funds. In the end the SNK European Democrats' campaign for the 2006 general election was unsuccessful, finishing with 2.1% of the vote and failing to have any representatives elected.

Jana Hybášková, elected as an MEP, became the party's first regular chairperson.

Election results 

 2002 Chamber of Deputies: SNK – 2,78% – no seats
 2002 Senate: SNK – 2 seats, ED – no seats
 2002 Prague's municipal government: SNK – no seats, ED – 15 seats
 2004 Senate: SNK – 1 seat, ED – 1 seat
 2004 European Parliament: SNK and ED in coalition – 11,02% – 3 seats
 2006 Chamber of Deputies: 2,1% – no seats
 2006 Senate: no seats
 2008 Senate: no seats

See also 
 Liberal conservatism
 European People's Party–European Democrats
 Liberal democracy
 Liberalism worldwide
 List of liberal parties

References

External links 
SNK – European Democrats official site

2006 establishments in the Czech Republic
Liberal conservative parties in the Czech Republic
Pro-European political parties in the Czech Republic
Political parties established in 2006